The Kalamazoo Tornado of 1980 struck downtown Kalamazoo, Michigan, on Tuesday, May 13, 1980. The tornado, which touched down at 4:09 pm, was rated F3 on the Fujita scale.  The tornado killed 5 people and injured 79.  Damage was estimated at $50,000,000, which included $1,800,000 in vehicle damage.

Path

It was notable for having struck the heart of downtown, damaging or destroying many notable buildings, parks, and landmarks. The massive F3 caused a power outage so extensive, phone companies pleaded for people to only use phones for emergencies. In total, the storm caused 5 deaths, 79 injuries, and about 1,200 people were left homeless.

An hour prior to the St. Augustine Elementary School being destroyed, all 328 students were sent home early thanks to adequate warning.

See also
 List of North American tornadoes and tornado outbreaks

References

External links
 The May 13, 1980 Kalamazoo Tornado case study (Grand Rapids office of the National Weather Service)
 Kalamazoo 1980 tornado MIGenWeb – Michigan Genealoty on the Web
 TWISTER! The 1980 Tornado Kalamazoo Public Library – Local History
 Kalamazoo, Michigan Tornado, Tuesday May 13, 1980 YouTube Video
 The Kalamazoo Tornado – May 13, 1980 YouTube Video
 "Kalamazoo 1980 Tornado". Kalamazoo County, Michigan, Genealogy and Local History. Archived from the original on 2007-02-19. Retrieved 2006-07-30.

1980,Kalamazoo
Tornadoes of 1980
1980,Kalamazoo
Tornado,1980
Tornado,1980
1980 natural disasters in the United States
1980 in Michigan
May 1980 events in the United States